Peerless is an unincorporated community in Daniels County, Montana, United States. The community has a post office with ZIP code 59253.

The post office opened under the name Tande in 1914. In 1925 when the Great Northern Railway extended its branch line west from Scobey the town moved to be closer to the railroad. At this time it was renamed Peerless, named for Schlitz-Peerless beer.

Demographics

References

Unincorporated communities in Daniels County, Montana
Unincorporated communities in Montana